William Cobbold may refer to:

 Nevill Cobbold (William Nevill Cobbold, 1863–1922), English footballer
 William Cobbold (composer) (1560–1639), English composer